The Golygina is a river on the southwest coast of the Kamchatka Peninsula. It flows into the Sea of Okhotsk. A Russian expedition under Vladimir Atlasov first reached it in the last decade of the seventeenth century.

References

Rivers of Kamchatka Krai
Drainage basins of the Sea of Okhotsk